Rizky Ahmad Sanjaya Pellu (born 26 June 1992) is an Indonesian professional footballer who plays as a midfielder for Liga 1 club Bali United.

International career 
In 2008, Rizky represented the Indonesia U-16, in the 2008 AFC U-16 Championship. Rizky won his first cap for Indonesia in a friendly match against Andorra on March 26, 2014.

Career statistics

Club

International

Honours

Club 
Mitra Kukar
 General Sudirman Cup: 2015
PSM Makassar
 Piala Indonesia: 2019
Bali United
 Liga 1: 2021–22

International
Indonesia U-23
 Southeast Asian Games  Silver medal: 2013

References

External links
 Rizky Pellu at Soccerway
 

Living people
1992 births
People from Ambon, Maluku
Sportspeople from Maluku (province)
Association football midfielders
Indonesian footballers
Indonesian Premier Division players
Liga 1 (Indonesia) players
Persis Solo players
Pelita Bandung Raya players
Mitra Kukar players
Bali United F.C. players
Indonesia international footballers
Footballers at the 2014 Asian Games
Indonesia youth international footballers
Association football defenders
Southeast Asian Games silver medalists for Indonesia
Southeast Asian Games medalists in football
Competitors at the 2013 Southeast Asian Games
Asian Games competitors for Indonesia